Battle Cry is the sixth live album by English heavy metal band Judas Priest, released on 25 March 2016. It was recorded at the Wacken Open Air festival in Germany on 1 August 2015 during their Redeemer of Souls Tour. The album was released as both a standalone title and a bundled package containing the DVD version.

Track listing

Note
Two songs Judas Priest performed at the festival, "Turbo Lover" and "Living After Midnight", were omitted from the album. However, they do appear on the video release.

Charts

Personnel
Rob Halford – vocals
Glenn Tipton – guitar, vocals
Richie Faulkner – guitar, vocals
Ian Hill – bass
Scott Travis – drums

References

Judas Priest live albums
Albums produced by Tom Allom
2016 live albums